Linum decumbens is a species of plants in the family Linaceae.

Sources

References 

decumbens
Flora of Malta